Greed is the debut and only album by the English nu metal band Pulkas.

Reception 
Writing for Chronicles of Chaos, Adrian Bromley praised the album, stating that the band "has managed to capture a vibe of metal music that seems too hard to find nowadays". The instrumentation of the band has been compared to that of Tool and Neurosis.

In retrospective reviews, Greed has been described as having "aged surprisingly well and hasn’t dated anywhere near as much as the likes of One Minute Silence et al". A 2020 list of "one-album wonders" by Louder Sound considered it "an unbelievable slab of alt. metal perfection".

Track listing

Music videography 
A music video was released for the song "Loaded".

Personnel 
 Luke Lloyd – vocals
 Martin Bourne – guitar
 Jules McBride – bass
 Rob Lewis – drums

References 

Nu metal albums by English artists
1998 debut albums